Malcolm Pyrah (born 26 August 1941) is a British equestrian. He competed in two events at the 1988 Summer Olympics.

References

External links
 

1941 births
Living people
British male equestrians
Olympic equestrians of Great Britain
Equestrians at the 1988 Summer Olympics
Sportspeople from Nottingham